Yoon Hi-Sang (born May 17, 1985) is a South Korean professional baseball player for the SK Wyverns of the Korea Baseball Organization.  He represented the South Korea national baseball team at the  2013 World Baseball Classic.

External links 
 KBO page
 Yoon Hi-Sang – SK Sports

1985 births
Living people
South Korean baseball players
SSG Landers players
2013 World Baseball Classic players
Baseball players from Seoul